The 2016 World Cup of Hockey (abbreviated WCH2016) was an international ice hockey tournament. It was the third installment of the National Hockey League (NHL)-sanctioned competition, 12 years after the second World Cup of Hockey in 2004. It was held from September 17 to September 29 at Air Canada Centre in Toronto, Ontario. Canada won the championship, defeating Team Europe in the best-of-three final.

Teams
The teams were officially announced on September 10, 2015, by the International Ice Hockey Federation. The teams were:
  (24-and-over players) — host
 
 
 
 
  (24-and-over players)
         Europe (Players from European nations not already represented in the tournament.)
   North America (23-and-under players)

National anthems
The national anthem for each team playing was played before the start of each game. However, there were two exceptions: no anthem was played for Team Europe because of the team's multiple national representatives, while both "The Star-Spangled Banner" and "O Canada" were played before games Team North America played. Team Europe players wore badges with their respective nations' flags on their jerseys.

Rosters

Each team's roster was limited to twenty skaters (forwards and defencemen) and three goaltenders. All eight participating teams submitted their initial roster of sixteen players on March 2, 2016.

Jerseys
Each one of the national teams' players wore a customized jersey manufactured by Adidas.

Group A

Group B

Venue
In contrast to previous World Cups, all contests in the 2016 World Cup were held at the same site.

Pre-tournament venues

The following venues were used across North America and Europe in the pre-tournament schedule

Pre-tournament games
All games are Eastern Daylight Time (UTC−04:00).

Start date: September 8, 2016.
Source: National Hockey League

Group stage
All games are Eastern Daylight Time (UTC−04:00).

Group A

Group B

Knockout stage
All times are local, Eastern Daylight Time (UTC−04:00).

Bracket

Semi-finals

Final
The final was played in a best-of-three format.

Ranking and statistics

Final standings

Scoring leaders
List depicts skaters sorted by points, then goals.

Source: WCH2016

Leading goaltenders
Only goaltenders who played greater than or equal to one-third of the team's minutes are included.

Source: WCH2016

Broadcasting
In Canada, Rogers Communications held broadcast rights to the tournament; the tournament was aired by Sportsnet in English and TVA Sports in French. Similarly to its sub-licensing agreement for Hockey Night in Canada, the semi-finals and finals were simulcast by CBC Television. Although it was initially reported that Rogers was allowed to match competing bids for the rights (such as by Bell Media and ESPN's TSN) per its holding of exclusive national media rights to the NHL in Canada, NHL Commissioner Gary Bettman denied that there was such a rule, and that the bidding process was "competitive".

In the United States, the tournament was broadcast by ESPN and ESPN Deportes in English and Spanish, respectively; NBC Sports, the national rightsholder of the NHL in the United States, passed on the tournament due to scheduling conflicts with various events being broadcast by its networks in that period of time.

ESPN also broadcast the tournament for the Spanish-speaking Latin American countries, the Commonwealth Caribbean, the Pacific Rim and Brazil. In Russia, the tournament was broadcast by Channel One and Match TV. In Finland, the tournament was broadcast by Viasat Sport and Nelonen. In Sweden, Denmark and Norway, the tournament was broadcast by Viasat Sport. In the Czech Republic, the tournament and exhibition games were broadcast by public channel ČT Sport and in Slovakia by Markíza. In Germany, the tournament was broadcast by Sport 1. In Poland, the tournament was broadcast by public channel TVP Sport.

The broadcasts incorporated the use of technology by British firm Supponor to allow for the digital replacement of advertising on the rink boards on selected camera shots. These allowed a single advertiser at a time to brand the entire board, localization of advertising in different media markets, and other customized graphics to be substituted onto the boards. Advertisements are replaced when cameras shots are switched to minimize distractions.

Officials
The NHL selected seven of their referees and seven linesmen to officiate the tournament.

See also

 2016 IIHF World Championship
 1996 World Cup of Hockey
 2004 World Cup of Hockey
 National Hockey League
 International Ice Hockey Federation

References

External links

2016 World Cup of Hockey Schedule & Results on ESPN

 
2016 in ice hockey
2016 in Toronto
2016–17 in Canadian ice hockey
Ice hockey competitions in Toronto
International ice hockey competitions hosted by Canada
International sports competitions in Toronto
September 2016 sports events in Canada
World Cup of Hockey